"Wher'm I Gonna Live?" is a song co-written and recorded by American country music singer Billy Ray Cyrus.  It was released in October 1992 as the third single from his debut album Some Gave All. The song was written by Cyrus and his then-wife Cindy.

Content
The male narrator comes home to find his wife has thrown out all his belongings on the front lawn and asks himself where is he going to go. Cyrus admitted in a 2013 interview that the song was based on his own experience at the end of his first marriage to Cindy Smith.

Cyrus said about the experience:

Chart performance
"Wher'm I Gonna Live?" debuted at number 62 on the Billboard Hot Country Singles & Tracks chart for the chart week of October 17, 1992, and reached a peak of number 23 on December 5, 1992, after 20 weeks on the chart.

References

1992 singles
1992 songs
Billy Ray Cyrus songs
Songs written by Billy Ray Cyrus
Mercury Records singles